The 2000 uprising in Egypt was massive and popular labour unrest and social protests, initially private then public, against president Hosni Mubarak and the government, demanding Democracy and reforms in Egypt. However, the initial uprising was against the use of force against peaceful demonstrators in Palestine, as part of the Second Intifada. Massive protests erupted in solidarity with the Palestinian protesters, demanding democratic reforms and an end to killings of demonstrators in Palestine and Gaza strip. Pro-Palestine protests became a symbol of Civil disobedience and Disorder movements in Tahrir Square, where protests first took place. Mass protests then swept the Middle East, inspired by the popular anti-Israel sentiment in Egypt. After 2 weeks of protests in Egypt, president Hosni Mubarak ordered a crackdown on protesters and banned the burning of Flags, due to the burning of the United States of America’s flag and Israel’s flag. Chants was also voiced at national protests and demonstrations in Cairo against War and demanded peace and full independence of Palestine. One of the most famous slogans was ‘أسفل إسرائيل’, meaning ‘Down, Down Israel’. Anti-Hosni Mubarak protests swept Port Said and Suez, led by mostly students. Massive General strikes and labour protests have been also sweeping Egypt, while increasingly violent demonstrations and growing street opposition snowballed into further escalation. The Military and Tanks was deployed to disperse demonstrators while protests escalated and drew more and more groups to join the movement, calling on reforms, an end to Corruption, Hosni Mubarak to resign and demand full independence of Palestine yet the annexation and defeat of Israel. Protesters used Civil disobedience, peaceful movements, bloodless disturbances and nonviolent boycotts by schoolchildren, students, Refugees and Teachers in downtown areas nationwide. Mass protests continued, and protesters were adamant to oust the government and close the borders with Israel and see better living conditions, but however, the amount of Police brutality left many shocked and outraged. Protesters also wanted political reforms, police reforms and justice and accountability over the killings of protesters in the Second Intifada and First Intifada. Massive protests occurred on 9 October, when police killed 2 after protesters chanted slogans and pelted rocks at the Security Forces. Once the zenith of the protests became the death of protests after the bloody crackdown in the country's largest square, Tahrir Square which quashed the movement.

See also
 Egyptian Revolution of 1919
 Egyptian Revolution of 2011

References

Protests in Egypt
2000 protests
Riots and civil disorder in Egypt